O. R. Kelu is an Indian politician and the current MLA of Mananthavady, Kerala.

Personal life 
Son of Shri. Raman and Smt. Ammu, he was born at Wayanad on 2 August 1970. Kelu is a farmer by profession. He is married to Santha P.K. and has two daughters. He had passed SSLC.

Political career 
He was the Member of Tirunelli Grama Panchayat for five years and became the  President of  Tirunelli Grama Panchayat for 10 years. He was the Member of Mananthavady Block Panchayat for 2 years.

References 

Communist Party of India (Marxist) politicians from Kerala
1970 births
Living people